The Sanremo Music Festival 1996 was the 46th annual Sanremo Music Festival, held at the Teatro Ariston in Sanremo, province of Imperia, in the late February 1996 and broadcast by Rai 1.

The show was presented by Pippo Baudo, who also served as the artistic director, with actress Sabrina Ferilli and model Valeria Mazza.

The winners of the Big Artists section were Ron and Tosca with the song "Vorrei incontrarti fra cent'anni", while Syria won the "New Proposals" section with the song "Non ci sto".

In this edition the Critics Award was named after Mia Martini (who died the year before). It was awarded to the song "La terra dei cachi" by  Elio e le Storie Tese.

Bruce Springsteen opened the first night of the Festival performing, out of competition, the song "The Ghost of Tom Joad".

After every night Rai 1 broadcast DopoFestival,  a talk show about the Festival with the participation of singers and  journalists. It was hosted by Ambra Angiolini with Luciano De Crescenzo, Roberto D'Agostino, Gianni Ippoliti and Pippo Baudo.

Participants and results

Big Artists

Newcomers

Guests

References 

Sanremo Music Festival by year
1996 in Italian music 
1996 in Italian television 
1996 music festivals